Vilma Pegado Nenganga (born 2 November 1996) is an Angolan handball player for Petro de Luanda. Nenganga made its debut in the Angolan national team at the 2015 African games.

As a youth player, she was a member of the Angolan team to the 2014 youth olympics.

Achievements 
Carpathian Trophy:
Winner: 2019

References

1996 births
Living people
Angolan female handball players
African Games gold medalists for Angola
African Games medalists in handball
Competitors at the 2015 African Games
Handball players at the 2014 Summer Youth Olympics